The Herald is one of South Africa's oldest newspapers, first published on 7 May 1845. The newspaper is aimed at the people of Nelson  Mandela Bay and is published daily from Monday to Friday, and is published in the form of "The Weekend Post" on Saturday. Online it is known as HeraldLIVE.

Distribution figures

See also
 List of newspapers in South Africa

References

External links
 HeraldLIVE

Herald
Publications established in 1845
Mass media in the Eastern Cape